Werdenberg was a county of the Holy Roman Empire, within the Duchy of Swabia, situated on either side of the Alpine Rhine, including parts of  what is now  St. Gallen (Switzerland), Liechtenstein, and Vorarlberg (Austria). It was partitioned from Montfort in 1230. In 1260, it was divided into Werdenberg and Sargans.

History
It is named for Werdenberg Castle, today located in the municipality of Grabs in the Swiss canton of St. Gallen, seat of the counts of Werdenberg (Werdenberger), 
The family was descended from count Hugo II of Tübingen (d. 1180), who married Elisabeth, daughter of the last count of Bregenz, thus inheriting substantial territory along the Alpine Rhine. His son was Hugo I of Montfort (d. 1228), whose son Rudolf I is considered the founder of the  Werdenberg line. 
Rudolf's sons Hugo I of Werdenberg-Heiligenberg and Hartmann I of Werdenberg divided the southern territory of the Montfort inheritance, establishing the two lines of Werdenberg-Heiligenberg and Werdenberg-Sargans.

In 1308 Werdenberg was further divided into Werdenberg-Heiligenberg (Linzgau) and Werdenberg-Werdenberg. The Vaduz line of Counts of Werdenberg died out in 1406 and  Vaduz passed to the Barons of Brandis.

The family fractured further into a number of cadet branches. The line of Werdenberg-Heiligenberg-Sigmaringen-Trochtelfingen remained influential in the early 16th century in the context of the Swabian League but was extinct in 1534.

The Werdenberg feud (Werdenbergfehde)  was a major series of feuds between the 
Werdenberg and their neighbours in the late 15th century, most notably their conflict with the von Zimmern family of Swabia.  The feud between the lords of Werdenberg and of Zimmern escalated in 1488, rising to an importance above merely regional concerns, influencing  the imperial policy of Frederick III and Maximilian I regarding the formation of the Swabian League, the Imperial Reforms and the history of the Old Swiss Confederacy.

Counts of Werdenberg

Below, a list of the counts of Werdenberg, numbered by order of ascension:

House of Tübingen

Partitions of Werdenberg under Tübingen rule

Table of rulers
(Note: Here the numbering of the counts is the same for all counties, as all were titled Counts of Werdenberg, despite of the different parts of land or particular numbering of the rulers. The counts are numbered by the year of their succession.)

Successor houses in Werdenberg-Vaduz
(Note: Numbering restarts)

House of Brandis

 1416-1456: Wolfhard, son-in-law of Albert III the Elder;
 1456-1486: Ulrich;
 1486-1507: Ludwig and Sigismund, brothers.

House of Sulz
 1507-1535: Rudolf I, maternal grandson of Ulrich of Brandis;
 1535-1556: John Louis;
 1556-1569: William and Alwig, brothers;
 1569-1572: Alwig;
 1572-1611: Rudolf II;
 1611-1613: John, sold Vaduz to the House of Hohenems.

House of Hohenems
 1613-1640: Kaspar;
 1640-1646: Jacob Hannibal;
 1646-1662: Franz Wilhelm I;
 1662-1686: Ferdinand Carl;
 1686-1691: Jacob Hannibal Frederick and Franz Wilhelm II, brothers;
 1691-1712: Jacob Hannibal Frederick, with Franz Wilhelm III (son of Franz Wilhelm I);
 1712: To the Prince of Liechtenstein.

See also
County of Vaduz
Lordship of Schellenberg

Footnotes

References
 
Gerhard Köbler, 'Werdenberg (Grafschaft)', in: Historisches Lexikon der deutschen Länder. Die deutschen Territorien vom Mittelalter bis zur Gegenwart 2nd edition Munich 1989, p. 605.
 Fritz Rigendinger: Das Sarganserland im Spätmittelalter. Lokale Herrschaften, die Grafschaft Sargans und die Grafen von Werdenberg-Sargans. Chronos, Zürich 2007.
 Carl Borromäus Alois Fickler: Heiligenberg in Schwaben. Mit einer Geschichte seiner alten Grafen und des von ihnen beherrschten Linzgaues. Macklot, Karlsruhe 1853 
 Gerhard Köbler: Werdenberg (Grafschaft), in: Historisches Lexikon der deutschen Länder. Die deutschen Territorien vom Mittelalter bis zur Gegenwart. 2. verbesserte Auflage, München 1989, S. 605
 
 Johann Nepomuk von Vanotti: Geschichte der Grafen von Montfort und von Werdenberg. Belle-Vue bei Konstanz 1845  209ff.

External links

Counties of the Holy Roman Empire
History of Vorarlberg
Medieval Switzerland
History of the canton of St. Gallen
History of Liechtenstein
Duchy of Swabia